José Moratón Taeño (born 14 July 1979) is a Spanish former footballer who played usually as a central defender, and the current manager of CD Bezana.

In a 13-year professional career he played mainly for Racing de Santander, appearing in 156 La Liga matches over nine seasons for the club (three goals).

Club career

Racing
Moratón was born in Santander, Cantabria. Since first appearing as a professional for hometown's Racing de Santander on 13 December 1998, in a 0–0 La Liga home draw against CD Tenerife, he would play for the club the vast majority of his career. During 2001–02's second division, at Campos de Sport de El Sardinero, he scored a decisive goal against Atlético Madrid as Racing returned to the top flight after just one year out.

Already established as one of the team's captains, Moratón suffered a severe injury which made him miss most of 2006–07. He played 18 games the following season, as the side achieved a first-ever qualification to the UEFA Europa League.

In the following two top level campaigns, Moratón was used exclusively as a backup, but still contributed with 23 matches combined as Racing managed to retain their league status. He also helped them to the semi-finals of the Copa del Rey, notably netting in a 3–2 win at AD Alcorcón (which had previously ousted Real Madrid), also the final aggregate score– precisely in the last-four stage, he scored in his own net against Atlético Madrid, in an insufficient 3–2 home victory and 3–6 overall loss. In June 2010 he was released by the club, ending a relationship which spanned nearly two decades.

Salamanca
Moratón played in 2010–11 with UD Salamanca in the second tier, starting in all the matches he appeared in and scoring a career-best five goals. In early June 2011, however, following his team's relegation, the 32-year-old chose to retire from professional football.

Managerial statistics

References

External links

1979 births
Living people
Spanish footballers
Footballers from Santander, Spain
Association football defenders
La Liga players
Segunda División players
Segunda División B players
Tercera División players
Rayo Cantabria players
Racing de Santander players
UD Salamanca players
Spanish football managers